Calliostoma jucundum is a species of sea snail, a marine gastropod mollusk in the family Calliostomatidae.

Description
(Original description by Gould) The size of the shell varies between 9.5 mm and 23 mm. The small, solid shell has a low conical shape. It is composed of about six conical whorls, with a slight vertical portion at base. The whorls are girdled with fine, uniform, beaded lines, the alternate ones being generally smaller, sometimes even not beaded, and the two basal ones surrounding the vertical portion being larger. The base of the shell is a little convex, similarly sculptured with about twelve concentric lines, gradually diminishing from the center to the circumference. The umbilical region is colorless, not perforated, and with a groove-like impression beside the columella. The aperture has a rhomboidal-orbiculate shape. The arcuate columella is smooth. The lip is simple. The colors are arranged in radiating flammules, alternately white, strawberry-red, and pale flesh-color, gradually shaded into each other. On the base the dark or light-red are distributed along the granules in a somewhat articulated manner. The shell is nacreous beneath.

Distribution
This species occurs in the Atlantic Ocean off Brazil and Argentina at depths between 10 m and 108 m.

References

 Dall, W. H. 1890. Scientific results of explorations by the U. S. Fish Commission Steamer Albatross. No. VII.--Preliminary report on the collection of Mollusca and Brachiopoda obtained in 1887-'88. Proceedings of the United States National Museum 12(773): 219-362, pls. 5-14.
 Ihering, H. von. 1907. Les Mollusques fossiles du Tertiare et du Crétacé Supérieur de l'Argentine. Anales del Museo Nacional de Buenos Aires (3)7: xiii + 611 pp., 18 pls.
 Dall, W. H. 1927. Diagnoses of undescribed new species of mollusks in the collection of the United States National Museum. Proceedings of the United States National Museum 70(2668): 1-11

External links
 To Biodiversity Heritage Library (3 publications)
 To Encyclopedia of Life
 To ITIS
 To World Register of Marine Species
 

jucundum
Gastropods described in 1849